Hans Peter Ludvig Dam (24 March 1884 – 29 March 1972) was a Danish freestyle and backstroke swimmer who competed in the 1906 Summer Olympics and 1908 Summer Olympics.

In the 1906 Olympics he was sixth in his heat of 100 metre freestyle and did not advance.

In the 1908 Olympics he won a silver medal in 100 metre backstroke. He was also a member of Danish 4x200 metre freestyle relay team, which placed second on its heat and did not advance.

References

External links
profile

1884 births
1972 deaths
Danish male backstroke swimmers
Danish male freestyle swimmers
Olympic swimmers of Denmark
Swimmers at the 1908 Summer Olympics
Olympic silver medalists for Denmark
Medalists at the 1908 Summer Olympics
Olympic silver medalists in swimming
19th-century Danish people
20th-century Danish people